Marcus Benard (born July 26, 1985) is a former American football linebacker. He was signed by the Cleveland Browns as an undrafted free agent in 2009. He played college football at Jackson State.

Professional career

Cleveland Browns
Benard was promoted from the Browns practice squad to the active roster on November 9, 2009. He had 7.5 sacks in 2010, his best season as a pro. After playing in only four games in 2011 due to injury, Benard was injured again in training camp and waived/injured by the Browns on August 27, 2012.

New England Patriots
Benard signed with the New England Patriots and was released on August 30, 2013.

Arizona Cardinals
Benard signed with the Arizona Cardinals on October 2, 2013.

Personal life
Benard collapsed in the Browns locker room in November 2010, during a press conference.

On October 10, 2011, on his way home from Browns practice, Benard was involved in a motorcycle accident.

References

External links
Cleveland Browns bio

1985 births
Living people
Players of American football from Michigan
American football linebackers
Jackson State Tigers football players
Cleveland Browns players
New England Patriots players
Arizona Cardinals players
People from Adrian, Michigan